Börstelbach is a river of North Rhine-Westphalia, Germany. It is a left tributary of the Werre. The spring is near by Mennighüffen. It dewaters a small section of the Ravensberg Basin.

See also
List of rivers of North Rhine-Westphalia

Rivers of North Rhine-Westphalia
Rivers of Germany